Jin Ji-hee (born March 25, 1999) is a South Korean actress.

Career
She began her career as a child actress, and is best known for her roles in the relationship drama Alone in Love (2006), the horror fairytale Hansel and Gretel (2007), the family sitcom High Kick Through the Roof (2009), and the teen mystery series Schoolgirl Detectives (2014).

In June 2019, Jin signed with new agency C-JeS Entertainment.

Filmography

Film

Television series

Web series

Television show

Hosting

Music video appearances

Theater

Discography

Singles

Ambassadorship 
 Public Relations Ambassador for the Seoul International Architecture Film Festival (2022)

Awards and nominations

References

External links

1999 births
Living people
Actresses from Seoul
South Korean television actresses
South Korean film actresses
South Korean child actresses
Dongguk University alumni